L'Hospitalet may refer to:

France
L'Hospitalet, Alpes-de-Haute-Provence
L'Hospitalet-près-l'Andorre, in Ariège
L'Hospitalet-du-Larzac, in Aveyron
Lhospitalet, in Lot

Spain
L'Hospitalet de Llobregat (commonly known as L'Hospitalet), a municipality and city in Catalonia
CE L'Hospitalet, football team based in L'Hospitalet de Llobregat
L'Hospitalet Pioners, American football team based in L'Hospitalet de Llobregat
L'Hospitalet de Llobregat Baseball Stadium
Transport in L'Hospitalet de Llobregat, operated by several companies, most of which are part of the Autoritat del Transport Metropolità, a transport authority managing services in the metropolitan area of Barcelona
Vandellòs i l'Hospitalet de l'Infant, a municipality in Catalonia
L'Hospitalet de l'Infant, a village in Catalonia